USC&GS Arago was the name of two ships of the United States Coast Survey and the United States Coast and Geodetic Survey, and may refer to:

, a schooner in service in the Coast Survey/Coast and Geodetic Survey from 1854 to 1881
, a steamer in service in the Coast Survey from 1871 to 1878 and in the Coast and Geodetic Survey from 1878 to 1890

Ships of the United States Coast and Geodetic Survey